William Grant Milne (11 May 1829, Banff, Aberdeenshire – 1866), was a Scottish botanist.

A gardener at the Edinburgh Botanic Garden, Milne joined the  expedition to the southwestern Pacific (1852–1856) as a botanist. The expedition visited, inter alia, Lord Howe Island, New South Wales and Western Australia. Milne was initially accompanied by fellow Scots botanist John MacGillivray, who left the ship in 1855 after a dispute with Captain Henry Mangles Denham.

Milne, the discoverer of several plants, including the rare New Caledonian tree Meryta denhamii which he found growing on the Isle of Pines in 1853 and sent to the Royal Botanical Gardens in Kew, had botanist Berthold Carl Seemann name the plant Meryta denhamii after Captain Denham (for whom the town of Denham, Western Australia was also named). The plant was described from specimens that had flowered in a greenhouse in Kew in 1860.

Eponyms
 Asplenium milnei Carruth. (specimen from Lord Howe Island)
 Stenocarpus milnei Hook. (specimen from New Caledonia)
 Freycinetia milnei Seem. (specimen from Fiji)

See also
 Henry Mangles Denham
 John MacGillivray
 List of gardener-botanist explorers of the Enlightenment
 European and American voyages of scientific exploration

References

 A.E.Orchard (1999) 'A History of Systematic Botany in Australia', in Flora of Australia Vol.1, 2nd ed., ABRS.

1866 deaths
Explorers of Australia
Scottish botanists
Royal Navy officers
Scottish sailors
19th-century Scottish people
1829 births